Henriette Koch (born 3 April 1985) is a Danish sports sailor.

She was born in Allerød, Denmark. At the 2012 Summer Olympics, she competed in the women's 470 class where, alongside crewmate Lene Sommer, she finished 16th.

References

Danish female sailors (sport)
1985 births
Living people
Olympic sailors of Denmark
Sailors at the 2012 Summer Olympics – 470
People from Allerød Municipality
Sportspeople from the Capital Region of Denmark